Phoenix Home & Garden is a monthly magazine based in Phoenix, Arizona, USA. It is written for people who desire information on Southwest USA living and regional advice for growing desert plants.

History and profile
Phoenix Home & Garden was first published in November 1980. The founders were Joel and Lila Harnett.

The magazine has received various national awards, including the Maggie awards from the Western Publications Association.

The magazine reported its paid circulation as 85,352 copies in September 2009 with monthly newsstand sales topping 11,000.

References

External links
 Phoenix Home and Garden website

1980 establishments in Arizona
Lifestyle magazines published in the United States
Monthly magazines published in the United States
Magazines established in 1980
Magazines published in Arizona
Mass media in Phoenix, Arizona